Gazzada-Schianno-Morazzone is a railway station in Italy. Located on the Porto Ceresio–Milan railway, it serves the municipalities of Gazzada Schianno and Morazzone.

Services
Gazzada-Schianno-Morazzone is served by the line S5 of the Milan suburban railway network, operated by the Lombard railway company Trenord.

See also
 Milan suburban railway network

External links

Railway stations in Lombardy
Milan S Lines stations
Railway stations opened in 1865